Bitragunta is a village in Nellore District of the Indian state of Andhra Pradesh. It is located in Bogole mandal of Kavali revenue division. It forms a part of Nellore Urban Development Authority.

References 

Villages in Nellore district